The Royal Thai Armed Forces (RTARF) are the armed forces of the Kingdom of Thailand.

The nominal head of the Thai Armed Forces (จอมทัพไทย) is the King of Thailand. The armed forces are managed by the Ministry of Defense of Thailand, which is headed by the minister of defence and commanded by the Royal Thai Armed Forces Headquarters, which in turn is headed by the Chief of Defence Forces. The commander in chief of the Royal Thai Army is considered the most powerful position in the Thai Armed Forces.

Royal Thai Armed Forces Day is celebrated on 18 January to commemorate the victory of King Naresuan the Great in battle against the Viceroy of Burma in 1593.

Role
The Royal Thai Armed Forces official role is the protection of the sovereignty and territorial integrity of the Kingdom of Thailand. The armed forces are also charged with the defence of the monarchy of Thailand against all threats, foreign and domestic. Apart from these roles, the armed forces also responsible for ensuring public order and participating in social development programs by aiding the civilian government. The armed forces are also charged with assisting victims of national disasters and drug control.

Some critics have contended that, in reality, the Thai armed forces serve two main functions: a) internal security: to safeguard ruling class hegemony from challenges by mass movements to expand the democratic space, and b) to satisfy the self-enrichment goals of the upper echelons of the Thai military.

In recent years the Royal Thai Armed Forces has increased its role on the international stage by providing peacekeeping forces to the United Nations (UN), in the International Force for East Timor (INTERFET), from 1999 to 2002 and participating in the multinational force in Iraq, contributing 423 personnel from 2003 to 2004.

Personnel
, the Royal Thai Armed Forces number 360,850 active duty and 200,000 reserve personnel, nearly one percent of Thailand's population of 70 million. This percentage is higher than that of the US, but lower than that of nearby Vietnam. The Thai military has more than 1,700 flag officers (generals and admirals), roughly one general for every 212 troops, a bloated number for a military of its size. By comparison, the US military as of 1 November 2018 had 920 active duty general and flag officers (GFOs) for a force of 1,317,325 personnel, or one flag officer for every 1430 troops. On 2 May 2015 1,043 new Thai flag officers of all three services promoted in 2014–2015 took the oath of allegiance. It is not clear how many retired during the same period. According to one observer, each Thai general has three aims: to align himself with politicians of the right political party; to ensure that he receives the best possible postings; and to enrich himself and share his takings with his subordinates thus ensuring their loyalty.

In early 2021, the Ministry of Defence announced a program to reduce the number of flag officers by 25% by 2029. , the RTARF has about 1,400 generals and admirals on its payroll: 250 at RTARF headquarters; 400 in the army; 250 in the navy; 190 in the air force; and 300 in the Office of the Permanent Secretary of Defence.

Conscription
Conscription was introduced in Thailand in 1905. According to the Constitution of the Kingdom, serving in the armed forces is a national duty of all Thai citizens. In practice, only males over the age of 21 who have not gone through reserve training are subject to conscription. The enlistment draft is held in early-April annually. On the draftee selection day, those who are called up for the draft report to their selection center at 07:00. During roll call, eligible draftees can request to volunteer to serve, or they may choose to stay for the lottery. Those who volunteer then undergo physical and mental health examinations including a urine test for drugs. The results of the urine test for drugs are entered into a Narcotics Control Board database. In 2018, of the first 182,910 men entered in the database, 12,209 men, or 6.7 percent, tested positive for drugs: 11,139 for methamphetamine, 750 for marijuana, and the remainder for other drugs. Over 3,000 of those who tested positive will serve in the military where they will receive drug rehabilitation treatment. Those who tested positive, but who were not drafted, will undergo a 13-day rehabilitation regimen in their home provinces.  Those who do not pass the physical and mental health examinations are promptly released. Enlisting volunteers then choose their service branch (Royal Thai Army, Royal Thai Navy, or Royal Thai Air Force) and the reporting date of their choice, and receive documentation of the year's draft selection, and an enlistment order to report for basic training with notification details of the reporting time and location. The enlistees are then dismissed for the day until the day that they must report for basic training.

After the enlisting volunteers are dismissed for the day, the lottery process begins. Each selection center has a set quota, and the number of individuals conscripted through the lottery at each selection center will be the quota subtracted by the number of volunteers. Those who choose to proceed with the lottery then undergo the same physical and mental health exams as the volunteers, with the same procedure for dismissal for those who do not pass the health exams. Each man who stays for the lottery draws a card out of an opaque box. Those who draw a black card are released from their military service requirement and are issued the letter of exemption. Those who draw a red card are required to serve starting from the induction date specified on the card. Those with higher educational qualifications can request a reduction of service obligation. In 2018, the Royal Thai Armed Forces called up more than 500,000 men for selection. The combined quota was approximately 104,000 men: 80,000 men for the Royal Thai Army, 16,000 for the Royal Thai Navy, and 8,700 for the Royal Thai Air Force. On selection day, there were 44,800 men who volunteered to serve. After accepting the volunteers and dismissing those who were deemed ineligible, there remained a quota of approximately 60,000 slots for approximately 450,000 men who entered the draft lottery, i.e., the overall probability of drawing a red card in the lottery was approximately 13 percent. In 2017, 103,097 men participated in the draft between 1–12 April. The armed forces needed only 77,000 conscripts per annum. It has not been uncommon for some selection centers to not have to conduct the balloting lottery at all, because quotas were met by the enlisting volunteers. In such instances, those who decided not to volunteer and stay for the lottery were all issued with a certificate of exemption.

Length of service varies by whether a person volunteers to enlist and their educational background. Serving a shortened period of time is given to those who enlist voluntarily. Those without a high school diploma are required to serve two years regardless of whether they volunteer. High school graduates who volunteer are required to serve one year, while high school graduates who draw red cards are required to serve two years. Those with an associate degree or higher who volunteer are required to serve for six months. Those with an associate degree or more who draw red cards can request a reduction in time of service of up to one year. University students can request for deferment of conscription until they are awarded their diploma or reach 26 years of age.

All conscripts are assigned the rank of Private / Seaman / Aircraftman (OR-1) for their entire length of service, regardless of educational qualification. There are wage increases after completion of basic training and for time-in-grade. Although it is alleged that more than half of conscripts end up as servants to senior officers or clerks in military cooperative shops, most conscripts regardless of their volunteer status and educational background are placed in an occupational specialty dictated by the needs of their service branch. The most common specialties are infantryman (for Royal Thai Army conscripts), Royal Marine (for Royal Thai Navy conscripts), and security forces specialist (for Royal Thai Air Force conscripts). Duties may include carrying out military operations, manning security checkpoints, force generation, as well as manual labor and clerical duties, depending on the needs of the unit. At the end of their service, conscripts are given the option of reenlisting to remain in the service. In April 2020, only 5,460 out of 42,000 conscripts scheduled for discharge at the end of the month volunteered to remain in the military.

Top government officials insist that conscription is indispensable, but some question the need for conscription in the 21st century Thailand and call for an open debate on its efficacy and value to the nation.
Critics claim that external threats to Thailand are negligible in 2019. The Thai government appears to agree: Thailand's new National Security Plan, published in the Royal Gazette on 22 November 2019, sees external geo-political threats to the country as insignificant in the years ahead. The plan, in effect from 19 November 2019 to 30 September 2022, views domestic issues, especially declining faith in the monarchy and political divisions, as greater concerns.

In a report issued in March 2020, Amnesty International charged that Thai military conscripts face institutionalised abuse systematically hushed up by military authorities. According to Amnesty, the practice has "long been an open secret in Thai society". One of infamous cases was in 2011 which 10 officers torturing Wichian Pueksom to death. Until today there is still no verdict to the officials.

Budget
The defence budget nearly tripled from 78.1 billion baht in 2005 to 207 billion baht for FY2016 (1 October 2015 – 30 September 2016), amounting to roughly 1.5% of GDP. The budget for FY2017 is 214 billion baht (US$6.1 billion)—including funds for a submarine purchase—a nominal increase of three percent. The proposed budget again represents around 1.5% of GDP and eight percent of total government spending for FY2017. The FY2018 defence budget is 220 billion baht, 7.65% of the total budget. According to Jane's Defence Budgets, the Royal Thai Army generally receives 50% of defense expenditures while the air force and navy receive 22% each.
The Ministry of Defense budget for FY2021 is 223,464 million baht, down from 231,745M baht in FY2020.

History

Ancient military forces

The Royal Siamese Armed Forces was the military arm of the Siamese monarchy from the 12th to the 19th centuries. It refers to the military forces of the Sukhothai Kingdom, the Ayutthaya Kingdom, the Thonburi Kingdom and the early Rattanakosin Kingdom in chronological order. The Siamese army was one of the dominant armed forces in Southeast Asia. As Thailand has never been colonized by a European power, the Royal Thai Armed Forces boasts one of the longest and uninterrupted military traditions in Asia.

The army was organized into a small standing army of a few thousand, which defended the capital and the palace, and a much larger conscription-based wartime army. Conscription was based on the "ahmudan" system, which required local chiefs to supply, in times of war, a predetermined quota of men from their jurisdiction on the basis of population. The wartime army also consisted of elephantry, cavalry, artillery, and naval units.

In 1852, the Royal Siamese Armed Forces came into existence as permanent force at the behest of King Mongkut, who needed a European trained military force to thwart any Western threat and any attempts at colonialisation. By 1887, during the next reign of King Chulalongkorn, a permanent military command in the Kalahom Department was established. The office of Kalahom, as a permanent office of war department, was established by King Borommatrailokkanat (1431–1488) in the mid-15th century during the Ayutthaya Kingdom. Siam's history of organized warfare is thus one of Asia's longest and uninterrupted military traditions. However, since 1932, when the military, with the help of civilians, overthrew the system of absolute monarchy and instead created a constitutional system, the military has dominated and been in control of Thai politics, providing it with many prime ministers and carrying out many coups d'état, the most recent being in 2014.

Conflicts

The Royal Thai Armed Forces were involved in many conflicts throughout its history, including global, regional and internal conflicts. However, most these were within Southeast Asia. The only three foreign incursions into Thai territory were the Franco-Siamese War, the Japanese invasion of Thailand in December 1941, and in the 1980s with Vietnamese incursions into Thailand that led to several battles with the Thai Army. Operations on foreign territory were either territorial wars (such as the Laos Civil War) or conflicts mandated by the United Nations.

Franco-Siamese War (1893)
With the rapid expansion of the French Empire into Indochina, conflicts necessarily occurred. War became inevitable when a French mission led by Auguste Pavie to King Chulalongkorn to try to bring Laos under French rule ended in failure. The French colonialists invaded Siam from the northeast and sent two warships to fight their way past the river forts and train their guns on the Grand Palace in Bangkok (the Paknam Incident). The French also declared a blockade around Bangkok, which almost brought them into conflict with the United Kingdom. Siam was forced to accept the French ultimatum and surrendered Laos to France, also allowing French troops to occupy the Thai province of Chantaburi for several decades.

World War I (1917–1918)

King Vajiravudh on 22 July 1917 declared war on the Central Powers and joined the Entente Powers on the Western Front. He sent a volunteer corps, the Siamese Expeditionary Force, composed of 1,233 modern-equipped and trained men commanded by Field Marshal Prince Chakrabongse Bhuvanath. The force included air and medical personnel, the medical units actually seeing combat. Siam became the only independent Asian nation with forces in Europe during the Great War. Although Siam's participation militarily was minimal, it enabled the revision or complete cancellation of so-called "unequal treaties" with the Western powers. The Expeditionary Force was given the honour of marching in the victory parade under the Arc de Triomphe in Paris. Nineteen Siamese soldiers died during the conflict, and their ashes are interred in the World War I monument at the north end of Bangkok's Pramane Grounds.

Franco-Thai War (1940–1941)
The Franco-Thai War began in October 1940, when the country under the rule of Field Marshal Prime Minister Plaek Phibunsongkhram followed up border clashes by invading a French Indo-China, under the Vichy regime (after the Nazi occupation of Paris) to regain lost land and settle territorial disputes. The war also bolstered Phibun's program of promoting Thai nationalism. The war ended indecisively, with Thai victories on land and a naval defeat at sea. However, the disputed territories in French Indochina were ceded to Thailand.

World War II (1942–1945)

To attack British India, British Burma and British Malaya, the Empire of Japan needed to use bases in Thailand. By playing both nations against one another, Prime Minister Phibunsongkhram was able to maintain a degree of neutrality for some time. However, this ended in the early hours of 8 December 1941, when Japan launched a surprise attack on Thailand at nine places along the coastline and from French Indo-China. The greatly outnumbered Thai forces put up resistance, but were soon overwhelmed. By 07:30, Phibun ordered an end to hostilities, though resistance continued for at least another day until all units could be notified. Phibun signed an armistice with Japan that allowed the empire to move its troops through Thai territory. Impressed by Japan's easy conquest of British Malaya, Phibun formally made Thailand part of the Axis by declaring war on the United Kingdom and the United States, though the Regent refused to sign it in the young king's name. (The Thai ambassador to Washington refused to deliver the declaration, and the United States continued to consider Thailand an occupied country.) An active and foreign-assisted underground resistance movement, the Free Thai, was largely successful and helped Thailand to be viewed positively in the eyes of the victorious Allies after the war and be treated as an occupied nation rather than a defeated enemy.

Korean War (1950–1953)

During the United Nations-mandated conflict in the Korean peninsula, Thailand provided the reinforced 1st Battalion of the 21st Infantry Regiment, Some 65,000 Thais served in Korea during the war. Thai foot soldiers took part in the 1953 Battle of Pork Chop Hill. During the war the battalion was attached at various times to U.S. 187th Airborne Regimental Combat Team and the British 29th Infantry Brigade. The kingdom also provided four naval vessels, the HTMS Bangprakong, Bangpako, Tachin, and Prasae, and an air transport unit to the UN command structure. The Thai contingent was actively engaged and suffered heavy casualties, including 139 dead and more than 300 wounded. They remained in South Korea after the cease fire, returning to Thailand in 1955.

Vietnam War (1955–1975)

Due to its proximity to Thailand, Vietnam's conflicts were closely monitored by Bangkok. Thai involvement did not become official until the total involvement of the United States in support of South Vietnam in 1963. The Thai government then allowed the United States Air Force in Thailand to use its air and naval bases. At the height of the war, almost 50,000 American military personnel were stationed in Thailand, mainly airmen.

In October 1967 a regiment-size Thai unit, the Queen's Cobras, were sent to Camp Bearcat at Bien Hoa, to fight alongside the Americans, Australians, New Zealanders and South Vietnamese. About 40,000 Thai military would serve in South Vietnam, with 351 killed in action and 1,358 wounded. Thai troops earned a reputation for bravery and would serve in Vietnam until 1971, when the men of the Royal Thai Army Expeditionary Division (Black Panthers) returned home.

Thailand was also involved in the Laotian Civil War, supporting covert operations against the communist Pathet Lao and the North Vietnamese from 1964 to 1972.

By 1975 relations between Bangkok and Washington had soured, and the government of Kukrit Pramoj requested the withdrawal of all US military personnel and the closure of all US bases. This was completed by March 1976.

Communist insurgency (1976–1980s)
The communist victory in Vietnam in 1975 emboldened the communist movement in Thailand, which had been in existence since the 1920s. After the Thammasat University massacre of leftist student demonstrators in 1976 and the repressive policies of right-wing Prime Minister Tanin Kraivixien, sympathies for the movement increased. By the late-1970s, it is estimated that the movement had as many as 12,000 armed insurgents, mostly based in the northeast along the Laotian border and receiving foreign support. By the 1980s, however, all insurgent activities had been defeated. In 1982 Prime Minister Prem Tinsulanonda issued a general amnesty for all former communist insurgents.

Vietnamese border raids (1979–1988)
With the Vietnamese invasion of Cambodia in 1978, communist Vietnam had a combined force of about 300,000 in Laos and Cambodia. This posed a massive potential threat to the Thais, as they could no longer rely on Cambodia to act as a buffer state. Small encounters occasionally took place when Vietnamese forces crossed into Thailand in pursuit of fleeing Khmer Rouge troops. However, a full and official conflict was never declared, as neither country wanted it.

Thai–Laotian Border War (1987–1988)
This was a small conflict over mountainous territory including three disputed villages on the border between Sainyabuli Province in Laos and Phitsanulok Province in Thailand, whose ownership had been left unclear by the map drawn by the French some 80 years earlier. Caused by then-Army commander Chavalit Yongchaiyudh against the wishes of the government, the war ended with a stalemate and return to status quo ante bellum. The two nations suffered combined casualties of about 1,000.

East Timor (1999–2002)
After the East Timor crisis, Thailand, with 28 other nations, provided troops for the International Force for East Timor or INTERFET. Thailand also provided the force commander, Lieutenant General Winai Phattiyakul. The force was based in Dili and lasted from 25 October 1999 to 20 May 2002.

Iraq War (2003–2004)
After the successful US invasion of Iraq, Thai Humanitarian Assistance Task Force 976 Thai-Iraq Thailand contributed 423 non-combat troops in August 2003 to nation building and medical assistance in post-Saddam Iraq. The Thais could not leave their base in Karbala as their rules governing their participation restricted them to humanitarian assistance which could not be accomplished due to the insurgency during the Thai's tenure in Iraq. Troops of the Royal Thai Army were attacked in the 2003 Karbala bombings, which killed two soldiers and wounded five others. However, the Thai mission in Iraq was considered an overall success, and Thailand withdrew its forces in August 2004. The mission is considered the main reason the United States decided to designate Thailand as a major non-NATO ally in 2003.

South Thailand insurgency (2001–ongoing)
The ongoing southern insurgency had begun in response to Prime Minister Plaek Phibunsongkhram's 1944 National Cultural Act, which replaced the use of Malaya in the region's schools with the Thai language and also abolished the local Islamic courts in the three ethnic Malay and Muslim majority border provinces of Yala, Pattani, and Narathiwat. However, it had always been on a comparatively small scale. The insurgency intensified in 2001, during the government of Prime Minister Thaksin Shinawatra. Terrorist attacks were now extended to the ethnic Thai minority in the provinces. The Royal Thai Armed Forces also went beyond their orders and retaliated with strong armed tactics that only encouraged more violence. By the end of 2012 the conflict had claimed 3,380 lives, including 2,316 civilians, 372 soldiers, 278 police, 250 suspected insurgents, 157 education officials, and seven Buddhist monks. Many of the dead were Muslims themselves, but they had been targeted because of their presumed support of the Thai government.

Cambodian–Thai border stand-off (2008–2011) 
Is an event that began in June 2008 over the border dispute with the Temple of Preah Vihear afterwards. There were many clashes between the two sides. Along with the claims of each party over the said dispute territory.

Sudan (2010–2011)
Thai soldiers joined UNMIS in 2011.

Current developments

Thai military deputized as police
On 29 March 2016, in a move that the Bangkok Post said will "...will inflict serious and long-term damage...", the NCPO, under a Section 44 order (NCPO Order 13/2559) signed by junta chief Prayut Chan-o-cha, granted to commissioned officers of the Royal Thai Armed Forces broad police powers to suppress and arrest anyone they suspect of criminal activity without a warrant and detain them secretly at almost any location without charge for up to seven days. Bank accounts can be frozen, and documents and property can be seized. Travel can be banned. Automatic immunity for military personnel has been built into the order, and there is no independent oversight or recourse in the event of abuse. The order came into immediate effect. The net result is that the military will have more power than the police and less oversight.

The government has stated that the purpose of this order is to enable military officers to render their assistance in an effort to "...suppress organized crimes such as extortion, human trafficking, child and labor abuses, gambling, prostitution, illegal tour guide services, price collusion, and firearms. It neither aims to stifle nor intimidate dissenting voices. Defendants in such cases will go through normal judicial process, with police as the main investigator...trial[s] will be conducted in civilian courts, not military ones. Moreover, this order does not deprive the right of the defendants to file complaints against military officers who have abused their power."

The NCPO said that the reason for its latest order is that there are simply not enough police, in spite of the fact that there are about 230,000 officers in the Royal Thai Police force. They make up about 17 percent of all non-military public servants. This amounts to 344 police officers for every for every 100,000 persons in Thailand, more than twice the ratio in Myanmar and the Philippines, one and a half times that of Japan and Indonesia and roughly the same proportion as the United States.

In a joint statement released on 5 April 2016, six groups, including Human Rights Watch (HRW), Amnesty International, and the International Commission of Jurists (ICJ), condemned the move.

Corruption
The Asia Sentinel in 2014 called the Thai military one of the most deeply corrupt militaries in Asia.  The Thai armed forces have a history of procurement scandals and dodgy dealings dating back to at least the 1980s.

In the 1980s, the army bought hundreds of substandard armored personnel carriers (APC) from the Chinese that were so shoddy that light was visible through the welds securing the armor plate.
The Thai air force bought Chinese jets with short-lived engines so delicate that the planes were towed to the flight line for takeoff and towed back on landing in order to minimize engine hours.
In 1997, the HTMS Chakri Naruebet aircraft carrier was commissioned. Due to its lackluster operational history, the Thai media have nicknamed the ship "Thai-tanic", and consider her to be a white elephant.
The Aeros 40D S/N 21 airship, nicknamed "Sky Dragon", was purchased for 350 million baht in 2009. It cost 2.8 million baht to inflate and 280,000 baht a month to keep inflated. It served for eight years, mostly in storage, and crashed once. The present leadership of the NCPO was instrumental in approving its purchase.

Weapons and equipment

Thailand's defense spending has soared since 2006. Since then the military has seized control from civilian governments on two occasions. Defense spending has increased by US$1 billion since the latest coup in 2014.

In early January 2022, Thailand's cabinet backed a plan to buy four fighter jets starting in 2023 with 13.8 billion baht ($413.67 million) budgeted for the purchase over a 4 year period to replace some of the country's aging F-16 jets.

Uniforms, ranks, insignia

To build institutional solidarity and esprit de corps, each Thai service component has developed its own distinctive uniforms, ranking system, and insignia. Many Thai military uniforms reflect historical foreign influences. For example, most of the distinctive service uniforms were patterned on those of the US, but lower ranking enlisted navy personnel wear uniforms resembling those of their French counterparts. The early influence of British advisers to the Thai royal court and the historical role of the military in royal pomp and ceremony contributed to the splendor of formal dress uniforms worn by high-ranking officers and guards of honour on ceremonial occasions.

The rank structures of the three armed services are similar to those of the respective branches of the US Armed Forces, although the Thai system has fewer NCO and warrant officer designations. The king, as head of state and constitutional head of the armed forces, commissions all officers. Appointments to NCO ranks are authorised by the minister of defence. In theory, the authority and responsibilities of officers of various ranks correspond to those of their US counterparts. However, because of a perennial surplus of senior officers—in 1987 there were some 600 generals and admirals in a total force of about 273,000—Thai staff positions are often held by officers of higher rank than would be the case in the US or other Western military establishments.

Thai military personnel are highly conscious of rank distinctions and of the duties, obligations, and benefits they entail. Relationships among officers of different grades and among officers, NCOs, and the enlisted ranks are governed by military tradition in a society where observance of differences in status are highly formalised. The social distance between officers and NCOs is widened by the fact that officers usually are college or military academy graduates, while most NCOs have not gone beyond secondary school. There is a wider gap between officers and conscripts, most of whom have even less formal education, service experience, or specialised training.

Formal honours and symbols of merit occupy an important place in Thai military tradition. The government grants numerous awards, and outstanding acts of heroism, courage, and meritorious service receive prompt recognition.

Officer and enlisted rank insignia

Gallery

See also
 Border Patrol Police
 King's Guard (Thailand)
 List of flags of the Royal Thai Armed Forces
 Military ranks of the Thai armed forces
 Royal Thai Air Force
 Royal Thai Police
 Territorial Defence Student
 Thahan Phran
 Underwater Demolition Assault Unit
 Volunteer Defense Corps (Thailand)

Notes

References

Further reading
 Osornprasop, Sutayut. "Thailand and the Secret War in Laos", 1960–1974 (in) Albert Lau (ed.), Southeast Asia and the Cold War. Milton Park, Abingdon, Oxon; New York: Routledge, 2012.  (hardback).

External links 

 Official website of Royal Thai Armed Forces Headquarters 
 Official website of Royal Thai Army
 Official website of Royal Thai Navy
 Official website of Royal Thai Air Forces 
 "Religion, guns tear apart south Thailand" – (2 September 2009) article in Asia Times Online giving an overview of the Thai army's use of paramilitary forces.

!
Military units and formations established in 1852
1852 establishments in Siam
Ministry of Defence (Thailand)
19th-century military history of Thailand

bn:থাইল্যান্ডের সামরিক বাহিনী